Der Wahre Jacob (German: The True Jacob) was a biweekly satirical magazine which had a social democratic political stance and was an organ of the Social Democratic Party (SPD). It was in circulation between 1879 and 1933 and based first in Hamburg, and in Stuttgart in German Empire.

History and profile

Der Wahre Jacob was launched in Hamburg in 1879. Its founders were Johann Heinrich Wilhelm Dietz and Wilhelm Blos who were serving at the Parliament. The former was also the publisher of Der Wahre Jacob. The ultimate goal set for the magazine was "to fight for the rights of the working classes in its peculiar and effective way." The magazine was mostly read by the members of the SPD.

Due to the passing of anti-socialist laws Der Wahre Jacob was banned by the Hamburg state government in 1881 just after twelve issues. In 1884 the magazine was restarted by Johann Heinrich Wilhelm Dietz in Stuttgart and from 1888 it was published on a biweekly basis. In 1910 another SPD magazine Süddeutscher Postillon was merged with Der Wahre Jacob. 

Because of the economic crisis experienced in the country the magazine published its last issue in 1923. It resumed publication in 1924, but its title was changed as Lachen links, and it was published with this title until 1927. In July 1927 the magazine was restarted with its original title, Der Wahre Jacob. Shortly after the beginning of the Nazi rule in the country the magazine ceased publication and the Social Democratic Party was banned in 1933 due to their sharp opposition to the National Socialism. The last issue of Der Wahre Jacob appeared on 25 February that year.

Content
Der Wahre Jacob published mostly articles about current events of politics which were concerned with the development of social democracy and labor movement. It featured these political contents via color illustrations and caricatures. The magazine frequently criticised Bernhard von Bülow, Otto von Bismarck and the policies of the German Reich. In the late 1920s and early 1930s it adopted an anti-Communist approach and advocated the view that "communists were devious, alien, destructive and perhaps even sub-human."

Editor-in-chiefs and contributors
Der Wahre Jacob was edited by the following: Wilhelm Blos (1879-1880; 1884-1887), Georg Bassler (1890-1900), Berthold Heymann (1901-1919) and Friedrich Wendel (1927-1933). Major contributors included Victor Adler, Arno Holz, Erich Mühsam, Clara Müller-Jahnke, Alexander Roda Roda and Emil Rosenow. Kurt Tucholsky also published articles in the magazine.

Circulation
Der Wahre Jacob sold 40,000 copies in 1887 and 100,000 copies in 1890. The circulation of the magazine was 230,000 copies in 1908. Its circulation raised to 300,000 copies in 1911 and to 380,500 copies in 1912. However, in 1914 when World War I began its circulation decreased by half. The magazine managed to sell 200,000 copies in 1919.

References

External links

1879 establishments in Germany
1933 disestablishments in Germany
Banned magazines
Biweekly magazines published in Germany
Censorship in Germany
Defunct political magazines published in Germany
German humour
German-language magazines
German political satire
Magazines established in 1879
Magazines disestablished in 1933
Magazines published in Hamburg
Magazines published in Stuttgart
Satirical magazines published in Germany
Social Democratic Party of Germany